Lantame Sakibau Ouadja (born 28 August 1977) is a retired Togolese football midfielder.

He was a member of the Togo national football team making 12 appearances and scoring one goal.

While playing for PSM Makassar in the 2008-09 ISL, Ouadja was given named captain just before the match against Pelita Jaya.

References

External links

 

1977 births
Living people
Sportspeople from Lomé
Togolese footballers
Togolese expatriate footballers
Togo international footballers
Étoile Filante du Togo players
Club Africain players
Servette FC players
Étoile Carouge FC players
Al Sadd SC players
Wisła Kraków players
US Monastir (football) players
PSM Makassar players
2000 African Cup of Nations players
Expatriate footballers in Switzerland
Expatriate footballers in Poland
Qatar Stars League players
Association football midfielders
21st-century Togolese people